Theriyama Unna Kadhalichitten is a 2014 Indian Tamil film written and directed by Ramu. The film features Vijay Vasanth and Resna Pavithran in the lead roles, and was released in October 2014.

Cast
Vijay Vasanth as Karthik
Rasna Pavithran as Gayathri
Pawan as Prakash
Uma Padmanabhan
Nizhalgal Ravi
Mayilswamy
Pandu
Rajya Lakshmi
Special appearances in the introduction song

Ajay Raj
Aravind Akash
Premgi Amaren
Sakthi Saravanan
Venkat Prabhu
Leo Sivadass

Production
The film marked the first production venture of V Vinoth Kumar and he chose to name his studio as Triple V Productions after his father entrepreneur H. Vasanthakumar, his brother actor Vijay Vasanth and himself. He was impressed by a script written by K. Ramu, who waited a few years to narrate the film to a producer, having previously directed television serials and apprenticed under Priyadarshan. The film's soundtrack was launched in July 2013 with several of Vijay Vasanth's co-stars from Chennai 600028 (2007) in attendance. The film had a delayed release, and was stuck for close to a year after production had finished.

Release
The film had a limited release across Tamil Nadu on 2 October 2014, owing to the presence of bigger budget films at the box office. It opened to negative reviews with a critics from The Hindu noting "there is little that is credible" about the venture. Another reviewer noted "Towards the latter part, the narration peps up, maintaining interest and pace till the end. Makes one wonder if it's the same director who had directed the first half". The film, nevertheless, celebrated a success meet to promote the film. The satellite rights of the film were sold to vasanth TV.

References

2014 films
Films shot in India
2010s Tamil-language films